The Basic Training of Pavlo Hummel is a play by David Rabe.

Rabe's first play in his Vietnam War trilogy that continued with Sticks and Bones and Streamers, its story is bracketed by scenes depicting the death of the everyman-like title character, who mindlessly grabs at a live hand grenade tossed into the Saigon brothel he is visiting. A born loser who is drafted into the United States Army, Hummel immediately encounters difficulties with both his sergeants and fellow recruits, none of whom trust him. As he stumbles through basic training and comes ever closer to the battlefield, he is guided by Ardell, a mysteriously ambiguous character who seemingly is an officer but serves as Hummel's conscience and a Greek chorus–like figure as well. Although injured repeatedly, Hummel is so determined to be a soldier he passes up a chance to go home, a decision that ultimately proves fatal.

Productions
Under the auspices of the New York Shakespeare Festival, the play premiered Off-Broadway at The Public Theater on May 19, 1971. Directed by Jeff Bleckner, the cast included William Atherton as Hummel, Albert Hall as Ardell, and Joe Fields as Sgt. Tower

The play opened on Broadway at the Longacre Theatre on April 14, 1977 in previews, officially on April 24, 1977 and closed on September 3, 1977 after 117 performances. Directed by David Wheeler, the cast included Al Pacino as Hummel, Gustave Johnson as Ardell, and Joe Fields reprising his role as Sgt. Tower.

Cast

Off Broadway production

Broadway production

Awards and nominations
Source: Playbill Vault

 Awards
 1971 Drama Desk Award for Most Promising Director – Jeff Bleckner
 1971 Drama Desk Award for Most Promising Playwright – David Rabe
 1971 Obie Award for Distinguished Direction – Jeff Bleckner
 1971 Theatre World Award – William Atherton
 1977 Drama Desk Award for Outstanding Actor in a Play – Al Pacino
 1977 Theatre World Award - Joe Fields
 1977 Tony Award for Best Actor in Play – Al Pacino
 Nominations
 1977 Tony Award for Best Featured Actor in a Play – Joe Fields

References

External links
 
 

1971 plays
Broadway plays
Off-Broadway plays
Plays by David Rabe
Obie Award-winning plays
Vietnam War fiction